Carla Evelyn Giraldo Quintero (born on August 30, 1986 in Medellín, Colombia) is a Colombian actress, model and singer.

She made her debut in television when she was 13 in telenovela Me Llaman Lolita where she portrays young Lolita Rengifo.

Filmography

Telenovela 
 2018 – Janeth, Las Munecas de la Mafia 2 .... Janeth
 2014 – Nora, La Emprendedora .... Nora
 2013 – La Madame .... Maribel
 2013 – Los Graduados .... Gabriela "Gaby" Torres
 2011 – Los Herederos Del Monte .... Rosario
 2010 – El Clon ....Latiffa
 2009 – Verano en Venecia .... Manuela Tirado Toledo
 2006 – La diva .... Nicole
 2005 – Juego limpio .... Claudia
 2000 – Pobre Pablo .... Jenny Paola Guerrero
 1999 – Francisco el Matemático .... Tatiana Samper
 1999 – Me llaman Lolita .... Lolita Rangel (niña)

Series 
 2013 – Cumbia Ninja .... Talita
 2008 – Tiempo final .... Claudia Guerra
 2004 – Enigmas del más allá .... Valeria Herrante

References

Colombian telenovela actresses
Colombian television actresses
1986 births
Living people
People from Medellín